Mercy Lavinia Warren Stratton ( Bump; October 31, 1841 – November 25, 1919) was an American proportionate dwarf, who was a circus performer and the wife of Charles Sherwood Stratton (known as General Tom Thumb). She was known as a performer and for her appearance in one silent film, The Lilliputians Courtship (1915).

Early life 
At birth Warren weighed six pounds. Warren was born as Mercy Lavinia Warren Bump at Middleborough, Massachusetts, the daughter of Huldah Pierce (Warren) and James Sullivan Bump. She was distantly descended from a French family named Bonpasse, from Governor Thomas Mayhew, and five Mayflower passengers: John Billington, Francis Cooke, Edward Doty, Stephen Hopkins, and Richard Warren—New England families which intermarried many times over.

Lavinia and her younger sister Minnie Warren had a form of proportionate dwarfism (considered to be desirable by sideshows and "museums" of that era owing to its perfectly miniaturized characteristics, with the same proportions as common larger people) caused by a pituitary disorder.

Performing career 

After a successful career as a well-respected school teacher, which began at the age of 16, Lavinia went to work as a miniature dancing chanteuse upon a Mississippi showboat owned by a cousin. She enjoyed performing, learned of Charles Stratton's (known as Tom Thumb) success, alongside the rest of the nation, and pursued a performing career as an adult. Under the management of showman P. T. Barnum, she changed her name from Mercy Lavinia Bump to Lavinia Warren, the stage name she had previously used while performing on the Mississippi River.

In February 1872 she visited England with Stratton (whom she had married), her sister and George Nutt (known as Commodore Nutt). They were photographed in Stonehouse, Plymouth, and all four signed the photograph.

Personal life 

Romantically pursued by the tiny entertainer George Nutt (known as Commodore Nutt), her affections belonged to Charles Stratton (General Tom Thumb). Warren met Stratton while working at Barnum's American Museum. Their wedding was one of the biggest events in nineteenth century New York. They were married in an elaborate ceremony on February 10, 1863, at Grace Episcopal Church and the wedding reception was held at the Metropolitan Hotel which included the couple greeting guests from atop the grand piano. Her sister Minnie Warren was her bridesmaid. While admission to the actual wedding was free, Barnum sold tickets to the reception for $75 each to the first five thousand to apply. After the couple was married, their fame grew even greater.

Though their fame afforded Warren and Stratton a life of luxury, it came with downsides. They were presented as childlike to the public by P.T. Barnum. This was an advertising strategy to make the audience feel sympathetic for them in order to sell more tickets. Though they were some of the most famous people in America at the time, due to the way they were presented, people treated them like children. Many people Warren met wanted to pet her and hold her. She wrote in her autobiography "It seemed impossible, to make people understand at first that I was not a child; that, being a woman, I had the womanly instinct of shrinking from a form of familiarity which in the case of a child of my size would have been as natural as it was permissible."

Even though Warren was not extremely fond of how she was viewed by the public, she still continued to perform. Since her life revolved around her presence in the media, she once said "I belong to the public."

Together, Stratton and Warren became famous. President Abraham Lincoln and his wife provided a reception for the new couple at the White House. Tiffany and Co. gave a silver coach to the couple. They amassed and spent a fortune over the course of their life together which would have made them millionaires by today's standards. They had no actual children, though they did pretend to in the public eye (pictured).

She became pregnant with a normal-sized child, but excitement was cut short by tragedy on July 23, 1878, when Minnie and her -baby died during the birthing. Several years later on January 10, 1883, Warren and her husband stayed at Newhall House in Milwaukee, Wisconsin on the day it caught fire. They were narrowly rescued by their friend and manager, Sylvester Bleeker, from what had been referred to as "one of the worst hotel fires in American history." Within 6 months, on July 15, 1883, her husband suddenly died at age 45 of a stroke. 

After her husband's death, Warren wanted to retire to private life, but was persuaded to continue her career.

Two years after her husband's death, Warren married an Italian dwarf, Count Primo Magri, and they operated a famous roadside stand in Middleborough, Massachusetts. At age 73, she appeared alongside Count Magri in a 1915 silent film, The Lilliputian's Courtship.

Death 
Warren died on November 25, 1919, at the age of 78 and is buried next to her first husband with a simple gravestone that reads: "His Wife".

See also 
 Middleborough Historical Museum, which exhibits a large collection of Lavinia Warren memorabilia

Notes

References

External links 

 
 "Sideshow Ephemera Gallery: General Tom Thumb" by James G. Mundie – biographical essay with photos
 Harper's portrait and report on Lavinia Warren's Wedding

1841 births
1919 deaths
Entertainers with dwarfism
Burials at Mountain Grove Cemetery, Bridgeport
Ringling Bros. and Barnum & Bailey Circus
American people of French descent
People from Middleborough, Massachusetts
Sideshow performers